is a Japanese politician of the Liberal Democratic Party and a member of the House of Councillors in the Diet (national legislature).

A native of Sanuki, Kagawa and graduate of Chuo University, Kimura worked at Sumitomo Bank from 1972 to 1975. After serving in the assembly of Kagawa Prefecture for one term, he was elected to the House of Representatives for the first time in 1986. He was a Senior Vice-Minister of Health, Labor and Welfare. Kimura also served in the House of Representatives between 1986 and 2009 as a member of the Kagawa old 1st district and Kagawa 2nd district.

Affiliated to the openly revisionist lobby Nippon Kaigi, Kimura has received support from the cult Mahikari.

References

External links 
 Official website in Japanese.

1948 births
Living people
Politicians from Kagawa Prefecture
Chuo University alumni
Members of Nippon Kaigi
Members of the House of Representatives (Japan)
Liberal Democratic Party (Japan) politicians
21st-century Japanese politicians